XHVSS-FM is a radio station in Hermosillo, Sonora, Mexico. Broadcasting on 101.1 FM, It is owned by Grupo Radiorama and carries a pop format known as Arroba FM.

History
XEVSS-AM 650 received its concession on April 25, 1991. Broadcasting from nearby Villa de Seris, XEVSS was owned by Radiorama and broadcast with 2.5 kW day. In 2011, it migrated to FM on 101.1 MHz.

When Radiorama exited direct operation of stations in Sonora, many stations became operated by Grupo Larsa Comunicaciones.

In August 2018, Larsa flipped XHVSS from romantic to grupera after two days of stunting. The entire format and intellectual unit moved to Larsa-operated social station XHHER-FM on July 31, 2019; days later, XHVSS became La Ke Buena as part of the lead-up to operation by ISA Multimedia.

ISA Multimedia ceased operations of its Hermosillo cluster on December 31, 2021. On January 15, 2022, the station changed to the Arroba FM format from Radiorama itself; that same day, XHESON-FM became La Poderosa.

References

Radio stations in Sonora
1991 establishments in Mexico
Radio stations established in 1991